Martia arizonella is a species of snout moth, and the only species in the genus Martia. Both were described by Émile Louis Ragonot in 1887. It is found in North America, including California, Arizona, Colorado and Utah.

References

Moths described in 1887
Phycitinae